The 1922–23 Scottish Division Two was won by Queen's Park who, along with second placed Clydebank, were promoted to the First Division. Arbroath finished bottom.

Table

References 

 Scottish Football Archive

Scottish Division Two seasons
2
Scot